The fifth season of the Brazilian competitive reality television series No Limite, based on the international reality game show franchise Survivor, premiered on Tuesday, May 11, 2021, at  (BRT / AMT) on TV Globo.

In February 2021, TV Globo announced that it would be reviving No Limite a second time for a 11–episode season with actor André Marques as the new host and 16 returning housemates of Big Brother Brasil as contestants.

A spin-off series  titled No Limite – A Eliminação would air alongside the show on Multishow on Wednesdays nights and on TV Globo on Sundays nights featuring a weekly re-cap episode and interview hosted by Marques with the eliminated contestant. An online spin-off show titled Bate Papo No Limite would air live immediately following the episodes on Gshow and Globoplay featuring exclusive content across social media sites and interviews hosted by Ana Clara Lima with the eliminated contestants and celebrity guests.

This season was the third to be filmed in Ceará, Brazil, following the first and fourth seasons, which were filmed in a different location. The grand prize is R$500.000 with tax allowances, plus a R$100.000 prize offered to the runner-up and a R$50.000 prize offered to the contestant in third place.

On July 20, 2021, Paula Amorim won the competition with 66.77% of the public vote over Viegas de Carvalho. André Martinelli finished in third place by a 5–4–3–0 live jury vote over fellow semifinalists Elana Valenária, Marcelo Zulu and Jéssica Mueller, respectively.

Contestants
The contestants were revealed on April 25, 2021, during the commercial breaks of TV Globo.

Future appearances

After this season, in 2021, Arcrebiano Araújo appeared in A Fazenda 13, where he runner-up the competition.

In 2022, Íris Stefanelli and Gui Napolitano appeared in Bake Off Celebridades 2, Napolitano finished in 15th place and Stefanelli finished in 13th place.

Season summary

Voting history

Ratings and reception

Brazilian ratings
All numbers are in points and provided by Kantar Ibope Media.

No Limite – A Eliminação

References

External links
 No Limite on Gshow.com

2021 Brazilian television seasons
No Limite 5